Suwon Gymnasium is an indoor sporting arena located in Suwon, South Korea. The arena has a capacity for 5,145 spectators and was built in 1984 to host handball events at the 1988 Summer Olympics. Today, Suwon Gymnasium is part of the Suwon Sports Complex.

Gallery

References
1988 Summer Olympics official report. Volume 1. Part 1. p. 195.

Handball venues in South Korea
Indoor arenas in South Korea
Venues of the 1988 Summer Olympics
Olympic handball venues
Sports venues in Suwon
Basketball venues in South Korea
Volleyball venues in South Korea
Sports venues completed in 1984
1984 establishments in South Korea
Venues of the 1986 Asian Games
Venues of the 2014 Asian Games
Asian Games handball venues
Asian Games table tennis venues